Nelson Jarvis Waterbury (July 9, 1819 – April 22, 1894) was an American lawyer and politician from New York.

Biography
Waterbury was born in New York City on July 9, 1819, the son of Col. Jonathan Waterbury (d. 1828) and Elizabeth (Jarvis) Waterbury, a niece of Bishop Abraham Jarvis.

He married Nancy D. M. Gibson (d. 1897), and they had three daughters and a son—Nelson J. Waterbury Jr.—who became his father's law partner in 1884.

The elder Waterbury studied law, was admitted to the bar, and in 1842 formed a partnership to practice law with Samuel J. Tilden. From 1845 to 1849, Waterbury was a justice of the New York City Marine Court. In 1855, he was appointed by Postmaster of New York City Isaac V. Fowler as his assistant and established the first sub-postal station in the city.

He was New York County District Attorney from 1859 to 1861, elected on the Democratic ticket in November 1858, but defeated for re-election in 1861 by Republican A. Oakey Hall. In March 1862, he was elected Grand Sachem of Tammany Hall. In 1863, Waterbury was appointed by Gov. Horatio Seymour Judge Advocate General of the State Militia. In 1865, he resumed the practice of law.

Although Waterbury left Tammany Hall after William M. Tweed became the boss, he defended Tweed at his trial following the fall of the "Tweed Ring". After Tweed's fall, Waterbury returned to Tammany Hall, but left again in 1875 disagreeing with John Kelly. Waterbury returned to Tammany Hall in 1890, being an admirer of Richard Croker and Mayor Thomas F. Gilroy.

Waterbury was elected a delegate to the New York State Constitutional Convention of 1894, but died three weeks before the convention met. He died of pneumonia at his residence at 13 West 56th Street in Manhattan.

References

Further reading
The New York Civil List compiled by Franklin Benjamin Hough, Stephen C. Hutchins and Edgar Albert Werner (1867; pages 401 and 531) [gives wrong year of election "1859" for Waterbury's successor Hall]
The New York State Register for 1845 edited by Orville L. Holley (page 394)
JOHN KELLY VS. NELSON J. WATERBURY in NYT on March 7, 1875
Obit of Nancy Gibson Waterbury, in NYT on March 16, 1897

1819 births
1894 deaths
New York County District Attorneys
Deaths from pneumonia in New York City
Leaders of Tammany Hall
19th-century American politicians